Lena May Jeger, Baroness Jeger (née Chivers; 19 November 1915 – 26 February 2007) was a British Labour MP during two periods. She followed her husband as Member of Parliament for Holborn and St Pancras South, holding the seat from 1953 to 1959. She retook the seat in 1964, retaining it until 1979, when she became a life peer.

Early life
She was born Lena May Chivers in Yorkley, Gloucestershire. Her father was a postman. She was educated at Southgate County School in north London, and read English and French at Birkbeck College, University of London. She was vice-president of the National Union of Students. She joined the civil service in 1936, initially in HM Customs & Excise.

During the Second World War she worked at the Ministry of Information and the Foreign Office. A fluent Russian speaker, she edited the British Ally, a newspaper published by the British government in the Soviet Union. 

She also worked at the British Embassy in Moscow. In 1948, she married Dr Santo Jeger, a general practitioner by profession, who had been Member of Parliament for St Pancras South East since the 1945 UK general election. She left the civil service in 1949, and worked for The Manchester Guardian from 1951 to 1955.

Political career
Jeger was elected to the St. Pancras Borough Council (1945–59) and the London County Council (1952–55), on which she represented Holborn and St Pancras South. Her husband died in 1953 and she was selected as Labour's candidate in the resultant by-election in Holborn and St Pancras South. She won the by-election, held on her birthday, by 1,976 votes, slightly increasing the Labour majority. She just retained her seat at the 1955 general election by 931 votes, but lost the seat to the Conservatives in the 1959 general election by 656 votes, losing to Geoffrey Johnson Smith.

After a period working for The Guardian, she regained her seat in the 1964 general election. The seat was renamed Camden, Holborn and St Pancras South in 1974, and she retained it until the 1979 general election. Despite the Conservative election victory, her seat was retained by Labour's Frank Dobson.

Jeger served on the Labour Party's National Executive Committee from 1968 until 1980, becoming chair in 1979. Following her retirement from the House of Commons she was created a life peer as Baroness Jeger, of St Pancras in Greater London, on 11 July 1979. In the House of Lords, she served as opposition spokesman on health, and then on social security.

She was chairman of the party in 1979 to 1980, and was the first peer to take the chair at the Labour party conference, at Blackpool in September 1980. She continued to write occasional pieces for The Guardian from 1964 to 2003, particularly obituaries.

Frank Dobson said of her career, "She pursued causes which may have become fashionable now, but were highly controversial when she espoused them." Jeger believed that MPs should "give a lead to public opinion and not always follow it."

Death
Lena Jeger suffered from poor health in her last years. She was treated at the Royal Marsden hospital for cancer, and was granted a leave of absence from the House of Lords. She died, aged 91, on 26 February 2007. She had no children.

References

External links
Catalogue of the Jeger papers at the Archives Division of the London School of Economics.

1915 births
2007 deaths
Alumni of Birkbeck, University of London
British civil servants
Civil servants in HM Customs and Excise
Civil servants in the Ministry of Information (United Kingdom)
Deaths from cancer in England
Members of St Pancras Metropolitan Borough Council
Life peeresses created by Elizabeth II
Labour Party (UK) MPs for English constituencies
Labour Party (UK) life peers
Members of London County Council
Female members of the Parliament of the United Kingdom for English constituencies
People educated at Southgate School
People from Forest of Dean District
UK MPs 1951–1955
UK MPs 1955–1959
UK MPs 1964–1966
UK MPs 1966–1970
UK MPs 1970–1974
UK MPs 1974
UK MPs 1974–1979
Place of death missing
Chairs of the Labour Party (UK)
20th-century British women politicians
20th-century English women
20th-century English people
Women councillors in England